Blue world may refer to:

 "Blue World" (Mac Miller song), 2020
 "Blue World" (Super Junior song), 2013
 "Blue World" (The Moody Blues song), 1983
 The Blue World, 1966 SF novel by Jack Vance
 Jonathan Bird's Blue World, underwater kids' educational TV show
 Endless Ocean 2: Adventures of the Deep, 2007 Wii video game released as Endless Ocean: Blue World in North America
 Blue World (album), a 2019 album of 1964 John Coltrane recordings
 Blue Wordd AS, a danish company, founded 2018, producing fuel cells

See also 
 
 
 Big Blue World, 1984 Paul Haig single
 Dark Blue World, 2001 Czech film
 In Blue World Tour, 2004 world tour by The Corrs
 Love is Blue, whose English lyrics contain the phrase "my world is blue".